Archie Alexander Meekison (born 4 May 2002) is a Scottish professional footballer who plays as a midfielder for Falkirk, on loan from Scottish Premiership club Dundee United.

Early life 
Meekison was born in Edinburgh on 4 May 2002. He played youth football in Fife for Kennoway United and AM Soccer. He attended St John's Roman Catholic High School in Dundee as part of the Scottish Football Association's Performance School Programme.

Club career 
Meekison signed his first professional contract with Dundee United in May 2019, having been attached to the club's youth academy for ten years. In February 2020, he joined Scottish League Two club Cove Rangers on loan until the end of the 2019-20 season, making his senior debut as a substitute in a win over Stenhousemuir. He made three substitute appearances for Cove before the season was ended early due to the COVID-19 pandemic. With both Dundee United and Cove being declared winners of their respective divisions, Meekison was connected with two title-winning teams that season.

In September 2020, Meekison went on loan again, joining Lowland League club The Spartans. He was recalled by Dundee United in January 2021 after the pandemic caused another suspension of lower league football. He scored eight goals for Spartans during his loan, including a hat-trick against East Stirlingshire in the South Region Challenge Cup.

Meekison made his first team debut for Dundee United on 21 April 2021, as a substitute in a 3–0 Scottish Premiership defeat against Kilmarnock at Rugby Park. This made him the second AM Soccer graduate to play in the Premiership after his United teammate Louis Appéré, who was also playing in the match. On 12 May 2021, he made his first start for Dundee United and scored his first goal for the club in a 2–2 draw at home against Motherwell.

On 26 January 2023, Meekison joined Scottish League One club Falkirk on loan until the end of the season.

International career
Meekison represented the Scottish Schoolboys team in the 2019 Centenary Shield competition.

He was selected for the Scotland under-21 squad in May 2022.

Career statistics

References

External links 

Living people
2002 births
Footballers from Edinburgh
Scottish footballers
Association football midfielders
Dundee United F.C. players
Cove Rangers F.C. players
Spartans F.C. players
Falkirk F.C. players
Scottish Professional Football League players
Lowland Football League players
Scotland under-21 international footballers